The Phillip Walker House (also known as the Philip Walker House or Deacon Walker House) is a historic American Colonial house in East Providence, Rhode Island.  It is the oldest known house in East Providence.

History

Although originally thought to have been constructed in 1679, the current house was likely built around 1724 on the foundation of an earlier house.  This 1724 date was confirmed by a dendrochronology survey of the tree rings in 2003. It is the oldest sawn timber-frame house in Rhode Island.  The home was added to the National Register of Historic Places in 1972. It has been owned by Preserve Rhode Island (PRI) since 1982 and used as a study house for historic preservation students and professionals. It is currently being rehabilitated with structural repairs, new utilities and a new kitchen and bathroom for residential occupancy by PRI's Property Manager.

See also
List of the oldest buildings in Rhode Island
National Register of Historic Places listings in Providence County, Rhode Island

References

External links
 East Providence Historical Society
 Philip C. Marshall, professor in the Historic Preservation Program
 Providence woman caps life of caring with $10 million bequest to RI Foundation
 Dendrochronological dating of Phillip Walker House

Houses on the National Register of Historic Places in Rhode Island
Houses completed in 1724
Houses in Providence County, Rhode Island
Buildings and structures in East Providence, Rhode Island
National Register of Historic Places in Providence County, Rhode Island
1724 establishments in the Thirteen Colonies